This is a list of the 2010 Super League season results. Super League is the top-flight rugby league competition in the United Kingdom and France. The 2010 season started on 29 January, when Crusaders RL played their rearranged round 4 fixture against Leeds Rhinos, and will end on 2 October with the 2010 Super League Grand Final.

The 2010 Super League season consisted of two stages. The regular season was played over 27 round-robin fixtures, in which each of the fourteen teams involved in the competition played each other once at home and once away, as well as their Magic Weekend fixtures played over the May Day bank holiday. In Super League XV, a win was worth two points in the table, a draw worth one point apiece, and a loss yielded no points.

The league leaders at the end of the regular season received the League Leaders' Shield, but the Championship will be decided through the second stage of the season—the play-offs. The top eight teams in the table contested to play in the 2010 Super League Grand Final, the winners of which are crowned Super League XV Champions.

Regular season

Round 1

Round 2

Round 3

Round 4

Round 5

Round 6

Round 7

Round 8

Round 9

Round 10

Table

Progression table 
 Numbers highlighted in green indicate that the team finished the round inside the top 8
 Numbers highlighted in blue indicates the team finished first on the ladder in that round
 Numbers highlighted in red indicates the team finished last place on the ladder in that round

Play-offs 

The 2010 Super League play-offs take place in September and October 2010. They decided which two teams will play in the Grand Final.

Format 

Super League has used a play-off system since Super League III in 1998. When introduced, 5 teams qualified for the play-offs, which was subsequently expanded to 6 teams in 2002. The 2010 season will follow the same format as the 2009 season.

Following the final round of matches, all eight play-off teams will be decided. The winning team from week one with the highest League placing will be allowed to select their opponents for week three.
Except this choosing opportunity, the new format follows the play-off system of the Australian Football League.

Qualifying and Elimination Finals

Preliminary Semi-Finals

Semi-finals 

 St Helens as highest ranked qualifying final winner chose their semi-final opponents from the winners of the Preliminary Semi-Finals, picking Huddersfield Giants. This was St Helens' final game at Knowsley Road before moving to Halton Stadium in 2011, and to New St Helens Stadium in 2012
 Leeds, the second highest ranked Qualifying Final winner, faced the other Preliminary Semi-Final winner, Wigan Warriors

Grand final

See also 
 Super League XV
 Super League play-offs

Notes 
A. Rearranged fixture to allow Harlequins RL to play their friendly fixture against Melbourne Storm, which coincided with round 3
B. Rearranged fixture to allow Leeds Rhinos to play their 2010 World Club Challenge fixture against Melbourne Storm, which coincided with round 4

References 

Results